, also known as Red Cape, Red Vest, or occasionally , is a Japanese urban legend about a masked spirit who wears a red cloak, and who appears to people using toilets in public or school bathrooms. Accounts of the legend vary, but one consistent element of the story is that the spirit will ask the occupant of a toilet a question. In some versions, he will ask if they want red paper or blue paper, though other versions identify the choices as a red cloak or a blue cloak, or as a red cape or a blue cape. Choosing either option will result in the individual being killed, so the individual must ignore the spirit, or reject both options and flee, in order to survive.

The legend and its variations
Aka Manto is described as a male spirit, ghost, or yōkai who haunts public or school bathrooms. Aka Manto is often said to haunt female bathrooms specifically, and in some versions of the legend, he is said to haunt the last stall in such bathrooms. The spirit is said to wear a flowing red cloak and a mask that hides his face, and is sometimes described as being handsome and charming beneath his mask.

According to legend, if a person is sitting on a toilet in a public or school bathroom, Aka Manto may appear, and will ask them if they want red paper or blue paper. Depending on the version of the story, the spirit may ask them to choose between a red cloak and a blue cloak, or between a red cape and a blue cape. If they choose the "red" option, they will be lacerated in such a manner that their dead body will be drenched in their own blood. The specific manner in which the person is lacerated differs depending on the account of the legend, including the person being stabbed or flayed. If the individual chooses the "blue" option, the consequences range from that person being strangled to all of the person's blood being drained from their body. In some versions of the story, the choices are between red and white paper, with the former resulting in a red tongue rising up out of the toilet to lick the student from below, and the latter resulting in a white hand fondling them from below.

If an individual attempts to outsmart Aka Manto by asking for a different color of paper, cloak, or cape, it has been said that they will be dragged to an underworld or hell as a result. In some versions, choosing a "yellow" paper, cloak or cape will result in the occupant's head being forced into the toilet, sometimes until they drown. Those who bring toilet paper with them into the stall find that it vanishes before they can use it, allowing Aka Manto to present them with its options. Ignoring the spirit, or replying that one does not want or prefer either kind of paper, is said to make the spirit go away. In some accounts, rejecting both options and running away from Aka Manto will also result in the individual's survival.

History
Author and folklorist Matthew Meyer has stated that the Aka Manto has been recorded as a schoolyard rumor dating back as early as the 1930s. In that time, the word manto commonly referred to a sleeveless kimono-style jacket, whereas in the modern-day, manto is the Japanese word for cloak or cape. Because of this, different generations have had differing views of Aka Mantos supposed physical appearance.
According to a theory, around 1935, in an elementary school in Osaka City , there was a rumor that a man in a cloak would appear in a dimly lit clog box in the basement, and it took a year or two for this to spread to Tokyo, and from there. It is said that the story of the red cloak was born. In Okubo , Tokyo in the early 1900s of the Showa era , it was said that the red cloak was a vampire , and that there were corpses here and there that had been attacked by the red cloak . In 1940, it spread to Kitakyushu, and was even rumored among Japanese elementary school students living in the Korean Peninsula under Japanese rule.

In popular culture
Akagami-Aogami appears as the monster of the week in the second episode of the 2000 anime series Ghost Stories.

The 2003 video game Castlevania: Aria of Sorrow features an enemy known as "Killer Mantle", which may have been based on the Aka Manto legend.

The 2019 video game Aka Manto, developed and published by Chilla's Art, is based on the legend.

In the 2021 South Korean television series Squid Game, players are recruited to a deadly tournament by a man who invites them to play the Korean children's game ddakji for cash. He offers them the choice of a red or a blue paper tile, but this choice does not affect the outcome. Hwang Dong-hyuk, the show's director, confirmed in an interview that this was a reference to the Aka Manto legend.

Aka Manto appears as a boss in the early-access role-playing video game World of Horror.

See also
 Akaname, a Japanese yōkai said to lick the filth in bathrooms and bathtubs
 Hanako-san, a Japanese urban legend about the spirit of a young girl who haunts school bathrooms
 Kuchisake-onna ("Slit-Mouthed Woman"), a Japanese urban legend about a disfigured woman who asks a question where either answer is dangerous
 Miss Koi Koi, an African urban legend of a ghost who haunts schools
 Teke Teke, a Japanese urban legend about the spirit of a girl with no legs

References

Bibliography

Further reading
 
 

Japanese bathroom ghosts
Japanese folklore
Japanese urban legends